Le Concert Champêtre ("Woodland Music-makers") is an 1857 oil-on-canvas painting by French artist Jean-Baptiste-Camille Corot, now in the Musée Condé of Chantilly, France. A reworking of a composition exhibited by Corot in the Salon of 1844, the painting was shown in the Salon of 1857.

The painting depicts three women, one with a cello, in the foreground of a forest landscape.

Sources
 

1857 paintings
Paintings by Jean-Baptiste-Camille Corot
Paintings in the collection of the Musée Condé
Musical instruments in art